A. K. Balan (born 3 August 1948) is an Indian politician and advocate. He was the Minister for Devaswom and SC/ST Development in the Left Democratic Front government under V. S. Achuthanandan from 2006 to 2011, Minister for SC/ST, Law, Cultural Affairs and Parliamentary Affairs in the first Pinarayi Vijayan ministry and a member of Central Committee of Communist Party of India (Marxist). He represents the Tarur constituency in the Kerala Legislative Assembly.

Personal life 
A. K. Balan was born to Kelappan and Kunhi on 3 August 1948 at Nadapuram in present-day Kozhikode district, Kerala. He is married to Dr. P. K. Jameela (Rtd. DHS) and has two sons, Nikhil Balan and Naveen Balan. Jameela was appointed Management Consultant at Aardram Mission in 2017. Naveen is married to Namitha Venugopal and is an international business developer in Paris, France. Nikhil is a graduate of Government Law College, Thiruvananthapuram and has also completed Post Graduation in Air and Space Law from Leiden University, Netherlands, becoming the first Malayali to complete the course.

Education
Balan received his B.A. degree from Government Brennen College, Thalassery, and also holds an LL.B degree from Government Law College, Kozhikode.

Career

Balan entered politics through students movement and served as the President and the Secretary of Kerala State Committee of Students' Federation of India (SFI). He took part in 'Land Agitation' and imprisoned for 30 days in Kannur Central Prison. He was elected to Lok Sabha from Ottapalam constituency in 1980 and to Kerala Legislative Assembly from Kuzhalmannam in 2001.

He is first electricity minister of any state in Indian history to electrify a district completely.
In February 2010, under his ministry Palakkad was declared first district in India to be fully electrified.

He is also having record of giving the most electricity connections to consumers in Kerala state.
Kerala also won the National Award for Energy Conservation during his period as minister. He was the Minister for SC/ST, Law, Cultural Affairs and Parliamentary Affairs for the State of Kerala and the Central Committee member of CPIM.

See also
 Kerala Council of Ministers

References

External links

Malayali politicians
Communist Party of India (Marxist) politicians from Kerala
Politicians from Kozhikode
Living people
1948 births
Kerala MLAs 2001–2006
Kerala MLAs 2011–2016
Kerala MLAs 2016–2021
India MPs 1980–1984
Lok Sabha members from Kerala